The Shenandoah Subdivision is a railroad line owned and operated by CSX Transportation in the U.S. states of West Virginia and Virginia. The line runs from Brunswick, Maryland, and immediately crosses over the Potomac River into Harpers Ferry, West Virginia, and continues southwest to Strasburg, Virginia, along a former Baltimore and Ohio Railroad line. Its northeast end is at a junction with the Cumberland Subdivision; at its southwest end, it intersects the Norfolk Southern Railway's B-Line.

History
The piece from Harpers Ferry to Winchester opened in 1836 as the Winchester and Potomac Railroad. The Winchester and Strasburg Railroad opened the rest of the line in 1870. The line became part of the B&O and CSX through leases and mergers.

References

CSX Transportation lines
Rail infrastructure in Virginia
Rail infrastructure in West Virginia
Baltimore and Ohio Railroad lines